Birmingham Library may refer to:

Libraries in Birmingham, England
Birmingham Library (17th century)
Birmingham Central Library (1971–2013)
Library of Birmingham, opened 2013

Libraries in Birmingham, Alabama, USA
Birmingham Public Library